This is a list of the New York Knicks' National Basketball Association (NBA) draft selections from the first and second rounds.

Key

Selections

References 

 New York Knickerbockers Draft Register from Basketball-Reference.com

 
National Basketball Association draft
Basketball Association of America draft
draft history